Grace Episcopal Church is a historic Episcopal church located at 5607 Gordonsville Road in Keswick, Albemarle County, Virginia, United States. The Gothic Revival building was designed by architect William Strickland in 1847. It is the only known work of Strickland in Virginia.  The interior was rebuilt after a fire in 1895.

"Both the church and the hunt club have a long history in Keswick. The congregation dates back to 1745 as one of the first six churches in the Virginia colony back when the Church of England was the official state-sanctioned religion. The original church was replaced with a new building in 1855 but a fire two decades later left only the tower and walls standing. Those were incorporated into the current church when it was rebuilt at the site north of Cismont on Route 231. The church’s 1,575-pound bell was salvaged and is still in use. In fact, it will ring 10 times at 9:45 a.m. on Thanksgiving Day to announce the 10 a.m. prayer service, calling the congregation, hunters, steeds and dogs together."

It was added to the National Register of Historic Places on October 21, 1976.

See also

 Episcopal Diocese of Virginia
 National Register of Historic Places listings in Albemarle County, Virginia

References

External links
Grace Episcopal Church website
Images of Grace Church

1747 establishments in Virginia
Churches completed in 1847
19th-century Episcopal church buildings
Churches in Albemarle County, Virginia
Churches on the National Register of Historic Places in Virginia
Episcopal churches in Virginia
Gothic Revival church buildings in Virginia
National Register of Historic Places in Albemarle County, Virginia
1847 establishments in Virginia